Nikon F 80-200mm lens refer to lens made by Japanese manufacturer Nikon, for its camera systems.

Overview
Nikon has manufactured 9 different zoom lenses with a focal-length range of 80 to 200mm range for its F-mount 35mm film camera or its full-frame DSLR lineup:
 4.5 MK-I (discontinued) 
 4.5 MK-II (discontinued) 
 4.0 AI-S (discontinued) 
 2.8 ED AI-S (discontinued) 
 2.8D ED AF  (discontinued) 
 2.8D ED AF II (discontinued) 
 2.8D ED AF III (discontinued) 
 4.5-5.6D AF  (discontinued)
 2.8D IF-ED AF-S (discontinued) 

All models are out of production, including the latest "AF-S 80-200mm 2.8D IF-ED". Instead, Nikon has released new lens in this focal length, such as AF-S VR 70-200mm 2.8G lens in 2003. In which, IF stand for Internal focusing while VR stand for Nikon's anti-vibration system, while the letter G behind the F number stand for the absent of aperture control on the lens (all G lens are D lens). To sum up, the new 70-200mm Nikon F-mount lens are not directly comparable to its older sister variant.

Generally, most Nikon F-mount 80-200mm lens have a larger maximum aperture than sister range Nikon F 70-210mm lens.

Specifications

Photos

See also
Nikon F-mount
List of Nikon compatible lenses with integrated autofocus-motor
Nikon F 70-210mm lens
Canon EF 70–210mm lens

References

External links 
AF-S Zoom-Nikkor 80-200mm f/2.8D IF-ED Sample pictures at momentcorp.com
Unofficial Nikon Archive by Photography in Malaysia

Nikon F-mount lenses